Noel Frank Johnson (28 December 1916 – 1 October 1999) was an English actor. He was the voice of special agent Dick Barton on BBC Radio and Dan Dare on Radio Luxembourg.

Life
Johnson was born 28 December 1916 in West Bromwich, England and attended Bromsgrove School, where his fictional character Dick Barton was listed on the honours boards.  He married Leonora Peacock in 1942: they had one son Gareth Johnson.  He died 1 October 1999.

Career
After wartime service in the Royal Army Service Corps, including evacuation from Dunkirk, he was invalided out, and joined the BBC Repertory Company in 1945. He was the original voice of Dick Barton from 7 October 1946, performing over 300 episodes before quitting in 1949 to pursue a stage career.  He was paid £18 per week but felt that he deserved much more for such a popular character.  He returned to play Dick Barton once more in a special series in 1972.  In 1969 he appeared in a BBC seven-part David Ellis radio thriller called Find The Lady. He later played Dan Dare on the Radio Luxembourg serial, but his name was kept secret.
His assured upper class voice cadence made him ideal for certain characters, notably in the BBC Radio 4 dramatic adaptation of A Dance to the Music of Time by Anthony Powell. This was broadcast as 26 one-hour episodes between 1978 and 1981; Johnson played the novel sequence's narrator Nicholas Jenkins, while the younger Nicholas was played by Gareth Johnson in the first 18 episodes. In the last quarter of the series – in which Jenkins is in late middle-age – Johnson plays Jenkins alone.

His movie career included roles in Frenzy, The First Great Train Robbery, For Your Eyes Only and his last film Withnail & I in 1987, where he played a militaristic and drunken bar owner. Johnson also appeared in numerous television dramas until the mid-1990s, including Dixon of Dock Green, Coronation Street, Out of the Unknown, Doomwatch, Death of an Expert Witness, Colditz, Rumpole of the Bailey, Doctor Who (in the serials The Underwater Menace and Invasion of the Dinosaurs), Inspector Morse and A Touch of Frost, amongst many others.

Filmography

References

External links
 
Noel Johnson obituary

1916 births
1999 deaths
English male radio actors
Male actors from Birmingham, West Midlands
People educated at Bromsgrove School
20th-century English male actors
British Army personnel of World War II
Royal Army Service Corps soldiers